Murtagh is an upcoming book written by Christopher Paolini.

Premise 
Set in the world of the Inheritance Cycle a year after, it centers on Murtagh.

Development 
Christopher Paolini had expressed interest in writing more books to continue the series. On Twitter, he had teased the book for 7 das before annoucing the book on March 8, 2023.

References 

2023 American novels
Inheritance Cycle
Alfred A. Knopf books
Novels about dragons
Novels by Christopher Paolini